is a 2011 Japanese television series and a remake of the 2009 South Korean series You're Beautiful.

Plot
Miko is a 20-year-old girl. She is pure but prone to make mistakes. Since her father, who was a composer, died, grew up at an orphanage with her twin brother Mio Sakuraba. Now, Miko is at a convent dreaming of becoming a nun. But one day, a strange man named Mabuchi asks her to join a famous band called A*N*Jell due to her brother being out of the country. Once she agrees, something bigger than a love triangle starts to evolve, along with other people intertwined in this story.

Episodes

Cast

A*N*Jell
 Miori Takimoto as Miko Sakuraba (female) & Mio Sakuraba (for disguised as male and playing as the real one too); A*N*Jell new vocalist/pianist
 Yura Furutachi as young Miko
 Kuu Furutachi as young Mio
 Yuta Tamamori as Ren Katsuragi A*N*Jell lead vocal & guitarist 
 Riu Tanaka as young Ren
 Taisuke Fujigaya as Shu Fujishiro A*N*Jell bassist
 Hikaru Yaotome as Yuuki Hongo A*N*Jell rapper & drummer

A*J Entertainment
 Takashima Masanobu as Ando Hiroshi (president of A*J Entertainment)
 Yanagisawa Shingo as Mabuchi Hajime (Mio's manager)
 Katase Nana as RINA
 Nose Anna as Sawagi Yumiko

Others
 Kojima Haruna as NANA (actress & idol) 
 Tanoshingo as Toru (assistant)
 Imori Miyuki as Sakuraba Shigeko (Miko & Mio's aunt)
 Manda Hisako as Mizusawa Reiko (solo singer & Ren's mother)

Paparazzi reporters
 Rokkaku Seiji as Deguchi
 Yamazaki Shigenori as Hashimoto
 Shimizu Yutaka as Baba

A*N*Jell's fans
 Takahashi Maiko as Misaki
 Aoi as Nanami
 Aizumi Moeri as Ayumi

Guests
 Koda Kumi as herself (ep. 1)
 Aoki Yuko as one of the guests in Mio's welcome party (ep. 1)
 Kato Sylwia as one of the guests in Mio's welcome party (ep. 1)
 Tanaka Minami as one of the guests in Mio's welcome party (ep. 1)
 Ishizaka Koji as Harada (ep. 1)
 Tani Kanon as a child from the Aozora Gakuen (ep. 1)
 Honda Miyu as a child from the Aozora Gakuen (ep. 1)
 Nagashima Terumi as a child from the Aozora Gakuen (ep. 1)
 Uchida Junki as a child from the Aozora Gakuen (ep. 1)
 Kasuga Kanon as a child from the Aozora Gakuen (ep. 1)
 Sasahara Naoki as a child from the Aozora Gakuen (ep. 1)
 Aoyama Kazuya as a child from the Aozora Gakuen (ep. 1)
 Yoshida Akane as a child from the Aozora Gakuen (ep. 1)
 Yashiba Toshihiro as an A.J Entertainment security guard (ep. 2)
 Uchida Mikako (内田三香子) as a waitress (ep. 3)
 Yabe Yukiko as a shop assistant (ep. 3)
 Fujimoto Ryo (藤本涼) as a street clerk (ep. 3)
 Tsujimoto Yuto (辻本優人) as a photographer (ep. 3)
 Aoki Kazuyo
 Masuda Naohiro (升田尚宏) as a newscaster (ep. 4)
 Katori Shingo as himself
 Jang Keun-suk as himself (special act ep. 8)

Music
It was announced that the band A.N.JELL from the TBS drama Ikemen desu ne will make their official debut on October 5, 2011.

This band was originally a fictional band for the drama with Johnny’s Entertainment members Tamamori Yuta (Kis-My-Ft2) as Katsuragi Ren, Fujigaya Taisuke (Kis-My-Ft2) as Fukishiro Shu, Hikaru Yaotome (Hey! Say! JUMP) as Hongo Yuki, and actress Takimoto Miori as Sakuraba Mio / Miko.

Their debut CD temporary titled A.N.JELL with TBS "Ikemen desu ne" Music Collection, will contain two discs – one including all four songs from the band and the other focusing on the OST of the drama with a special package to add. It will be released in two versions of Limited Edition and Regular Edition with the limited version including an original PV and a unique CD jacket. Also, the first print version of this regular version will enclose a rare CD jacket before Sakuraba was a member.

Disc 1
promise
futari (ふたり)
alone
Miss You

Disc 2
Ikemen desu ne Main Theme (美男ですね　メインテーマ)
Girl's Soul
Sunrise Shower
Youphoria
Pursuer
Aenaku naru mae ni (会えなくなる前に)
Ashita hareru kana (アシタハレルカナ)
Moon Knows
Run and Dive
Sky Sky Sky
Let's Play Tag
Bad Relations
Akegata no niji (明け方の虹)
You Are Not My Angel
My Formal Crisis
The Story Has Not Ended Yet
Tobikkiri no ai o komete (とびっきりの愛をこめて)
Asagi-iro no yoru (浅葱色の夜)
Someone's Sorrow
He Is My Hero
Yousei no kattou (妖精の葛藤)
Kokoro no oku no kata e (心の奥の方へ)
Ikemen desu ne Main Theme (美男ですね　メインテーマ) (Strings ver.)
Aenaku naru mae ni (会えなくなる前に) (Strings ver.)
Akegata no niji (明け方の虹) (Strings ver.)

References

External links
  

Kin'yō Dorama
2011 Japanese television series debuts
2011 Japanese television series endings
Musical television series
Japanese television series based on South Korean television series